Triathlon and duathlon competitions at the 2021 Southeast Asian Games took place in Tuần Châu, Quảng Ninh, Vietnam from 14 to 15 May 2022.

Medal table

Medalists

Triathlon

Duathlon

References

Triathlon
Southeast Asian Games
2021